The Syp is a river in Perm Krai, Russia, a left tributary of the Iren, which in turn is a tributary of the Sylva. The main tributaries are the Beryozovka and the Kurmakash (right).

References 

Rivers of Perm Krai